Macrochiton is a genus of katydids in the family Tettigoniidae.

Species

References 

Pseudophyllinae
Orthoptera of South America
Tettigoniidae genera